Batenia is a genus of moth in the family Gelechiidae. It contains the species Batenia fasciella, which is found in Algeria.

The wingspan is about 8.5 mm. The forewings are white, with two transverse bands. The hindwings are grey.

References

Gelechiinae